Heidekreis ("Heath district") is a district (Landkreis) in Lower Saxony, Germany. It is bounded by (from the north and clockwise) the districts of Harburg, Lüneburg, Uelzen, Celle, Hanover, Nienburg, Verden and Rotenburg.

History
Historically the region belonged to the Duchy of Brunswick-Lüneburg and its successor states. The district was established in 1977 by merging the former districts of Soltau and Fallingbostel as Soltau-Fallingbostel. On 1 August 2011 it was renamed to Heidekreis.

Geography
The district includes the western half of the Lüneburg Heath (Lüneburger Heide). Since this landscape is so characteristic for the district, it calls itself "the Heath District". The capital is Bad Fallingbostel, although it has only 11,800 inhabitants and is only the fifth largest town in the district.

Coat of arms
The coat of arms displays:
 in the upper half the heraldic lion of the Duchy of Brunswick-Lüneburg
 in the lower half a megalithic grave

Towns and municipalities

Culture and places of interest 
Cultural matters are looked after by those charged with communal cultural support within the towns and municipalities, the parishes, the banks, the Lüneburg Regional Association and private cultural initiatives.

Museums and collections 
 Dat ole Hus (heath and open-air museum in Wilsede)
 German Tank Museum in Munster (German military history of the 20th century)
 Düshorn Village Museum (life and work around 100 years ago)
 Hof der Heidmark in Bad Fallingbostel (memorial to the Heidmark)
 Klingendes Museum (mechanical musical instruments) in Schwarmstedt
 Museum of the Archaeological Working Group in Bad Fallingbostel 
 Soltau Museum (local history and archaeological exhibition) in Soltau
 Soltau Toy Museum (toys from four centuries)
 Peetshof (Zeugen Wietzendorfs um 1900) in Wietzendorf
 Prussian History (Pavillon im Landschaftspark Iserhatsche) in Bispingen
 Pult- und Federkielmuseum (Schulmuseum in Insel) in Schneverdingen
 Rischmannshof Heath Museum (heath and open-air museum) in Walsrode
 Schäferhof Neuenkirchen (Moorland sheep rearing to preserve the heath and moorlands between Neuenkirchen and Soltau) in Neuenkirchen 
 Heimathaus auf dem Schroershof (historic farmstead with many buildings) in Neuenkirchen
 Art Society and Springhornhof Foundation in Neuenkirchen
 Bothmer School Museum (schools in the times of the Emperor) in Schwarmstedt
 Ehrhorn Woodland Museum (woods – heathland – people) in Schneverdingen

Cinemas 
 Munster: Deutsches Haus 

 Walsrode: Capitol-Theater

Lüneburg Regional Association 
The district is a member of the Lüneburg Regional Association (Lüneburgischer Landschaftsverband), which looks after regional, cultural-political tasks.

Nature reserves 
There are 29 nature reserves in the Heidekreis. The largest one (Lüneburg Heath Nature Reserve) has an area of 13,222 ha in the territory of the Heidekreis, the smallest (Söhlbruch) has an area of 8 ha.

Jewish cemeteries 
There are four Jewish cemeteries in Soltau-Fallingbostel : in Ahlden, Rethem, Soltau und Walsrode. There are protected cultural monuments – stone witnesses to former Jewish communities and a thriving Jewish parish live into the 1930s. The cemeteries are mainly on the edge of parishes.

See also
Hannover–Braunschweig–Göttingen–Wolfsburg Metropolitan Region

References

External links

 Official website (German)

 
Districts of Lower Saxony